Jeremy Bracco (born March 17, 1997) is an American professional ice hockey forward who is currently playing with Barys Astana in the Kontinental Hockey League (KHL). He was selected by the Toronto Maple Leafs, 61st overall, in the 2015 NHL Entry Draft.

Playing career
Bracco played high school hockey at Portledge School before joining the USA Hockey National Team Development Program (U.S. NTDP). As a member of the U.S. NTDP, he played the 2013–14 and 2014–15 seasons in the United States Hockey League (USHL). Bracco's outstanding play was rewarded when he was invited to skate in the 2014 CCM/USA Hockey All-American Prospects Game.

Bracco committed to play the 2015–16 season with Boston College, but left the college after 5 games to join the Kitchener Rangers of the OHL.

After three seasons within the Maple Leafs organization, playing exclusively with AHL affiliate the Toronto Marlies, Bracco as an impending restricted free agent was not tendered a qualifying offer and was released to free agency.

On October 16, 2020, Bracco was signed to a one-year, two-way, league minimum contract with the Carolina Hurricanes. After attending the Hurricanes training camp for the pandemic delayed 2020–21 season, Bracco was unable to make the roster and was reassigned to AHL affiliate, the Chicago Wolves. Prior to the beginning of the AHL season, having secured a lucrative offer abroad, Bracco was placed on unconditional waivers in order to mutually terminate his contract with the Hurricanes on January 26, 2021. He was immediately announced to have signed a European contract for the remainder of the season with Finnish outfit KalPa of the Liiga.

After spending the 2021–22 season in Germany with Krefeld Pinguine of the Deutsche Eishockey Liga (DEL), Bracco having been unable to help the club avoid relegation, left as a free agent.

On July 20, 2022, Bracco agreed to a one-year contract with Kazakh based KHL club, Barys Nur-Sultan, for the 2022–23 season.

International play
Bracco competed as a member of Team USA at the 2015 IIHF World U18 Championships, where he assisted on the overtime game-winning goal to defeat Finland in the gold medal game.

Career statistics

Regular season and playoffs

International

Awards and honours

References

External links

1997 births
American men's ice hockey right wingers
Barys Nur-Sultan players
Boston College Eagles men's ice hockey players
KalPa players
Kitchener Rangers players
Krefeld Pinguine players
Living people
People from Freeport, New York
Toronto Maple Leafs draft picks
Toronto Marlies players
USA Hockey National Team Development Program players
Windsor Spitfires players